Carlo Casini (4 March 1935 – 23 March 2020) was an Italian politician and pro-life advocate. He was a member of the European Parliament (MEP) from 8 May 2006 until 30 June 2014, he served in a seat left vacant following the 2006 Italian general election. He represented the Union of Christian and Centre Democrats within the EPP parliamentary group. He was also an MEP from 1984 to 1999.

References

1935 births
2020 deaths
Politicians from Florence
Christian Democracy (Italy) politicians
Christian Democratic Centre politicians
Union of the Centre (2002) politicians
Deputies of Legislature VIII of Italy
Deputies of Legislature IX of Italy
Deputies of Legislature X of Italy
Deputies of Legislature XI of Italy
Union of the Centre (2002) MEPs
MEPs for Italy 1984–1989
MEPs for Italy 1989–1994
MEPs for Italy 1994–1999
MEPs for Italy 2004–2009
MEPs for Italy 2009–2014